Herman(n) Alexander von Salza (16 April 1885 Haapsalu – 23 January 1946 Moscow) was an Estonian  rear admiral of Baltic-German descent.

In 1907 he graduated from a military marine school in St. Petersburg. He participated in WW I. In 1917 he was appointed to the commander of Russian battleship Petropavlovsk. In 1918 he moved to Estonia and joined the Estonian Defence Forces, becoming chief of the Estonian Navy 1925–1932.

In 1934 he was awarded the Order of the Cross of the Eagle, II class.
In 1939, Salza left Estonia for Germany. In Germany, he was also given the rank of Rear Admiral, but did not enter the Kriegsmarine for actual military service. When World War II came to an end, Hermann Salza remained in the occupied territory of the Red Army because she did not want to leave her sick mother. He was arrested in April 1945 and taken to the USSR, where he died in 1946.

References

1885 births
1946 deaths
Estonian admirals
Estonian people of Baltic German descent
Kriegsmarine admirals
Russian military personnel of World War I
Recipients of the Military Order of the Cross of the Eagle